Two Japanese destroyers have been named Fuyuzuki or archaically Fuyutsuki:

 , an  launched in 1944 and scrapped in 1948
 , an  launched in 2012

Japanese Navy ship names